Reginald Leslie Cleveland (born May 23, 1948) is a  Canadian former professional baseball player. A right-handed pitcher, Cleveland appeared in 428 games in Major League Baseball over 13 seasons (1969–81) for four teams. He was elected to the Canadian Baseball Hall of Fame in 1986.

Career
In his first full season, he won 12 games and the  National League Rookie Pitcher of the Year Award from The Sporting News. He hurled for the Cardinals (through ), Boston Red Sox (–78), Texas Rangers and Milwaukee Brewers (–81).

As a member of the pennant-winning 1975 Red Sox, he was the starting pitcher in Game 2 of the 1975 American League Championship Series against the Oakland Athletics. He allowed three runs and seven hits in five innings of work, exiting the game with the score tied, 3–3. He earned a no-decision, with Red Sox relief pitcher Roger Moret gaining credit for the win when Boston prevailed, 6–3. Then, in the 1975 World Series, Cleveland worked in three games, two in relief. He was the starting pitcher in Game 5 against the Cincinnati Reds on October 16 at Riverfront Stadium. He gave up seven hits and five runs, all earned, and was charged with the 6–2 loss. He also came out of the bullpen in the top of the ninth inning of Game 7 at Fenway Park and got the final out, but the Reds had already forged ahead against Cleveland's predecessor on the mound, Jim Burton, and secured a 4–3 win and the world championship. The 1975 campaign afforded Cleveland his only postseason appearances; in his four games and 11 innings pitched, he compiled a 0–1 win–loss record and a 6.17 earned run average.

He ended his regular-season MLB career with 105 wins and 106 defeats, with a 3.73 ERA, 930 strikeouts, 57 complete games (in 203 career starting assignments), 12 shutouts and 25 saves. In 1,809 innings pitched, he allowed 1,843 hits and 543 bases on balls. In , while with the Red Sox, Cleveland led the American League in fewest home runs allowed per nine innings (0.159). He allowed only 3 home runs in 170 innings pitched that year.  He served as a pitching coach in the Toronto Blue Jays' organisation during the 1990s.

Personal life
He has five children, adopted sons Timothy and Jonathan Cleveland, former Olympic swimmer, and three biological children, daughter Michelle and sons Michael and Todd from his first marriage to Kathleen (née Kubicki).

References

External links 

Baseball Gauge
Retrosheet
Venezuelan Professional Baseball League

1948 births
Living people
Águilas del Zulia players
Canadian expatriate baseball players in Venezuela
Arkansas Travelers players
Baseball people from Saskatchewan
Boston Red Sox players
Canadian Baseball Hall of Fame inductees
Canadian emigrants to the United States
Canadian expatriate baseball players in the United States
Eugene Emeralds players
Florida Instructional League Cardinals players
Lewiston Broncs players
Major League Baseball pitchers
Major League Baseball players from Canada
Milwaukee Brewers players
People from Swift Current
St. Louis Cardinals players
St. Petersburg Cardinals players
Texas Rangers players
Tulsa Oilers (baseball) players